Jon Oosterhuis (born June 13, 1977) is a former Canadian football fullback for the Winnipeg Blue Bombers of the Canadian Football League (CFL). He was drafted by the Calgary Stampeders with the eighth overall pick in the 2002 CFL Draft. He played college football at New Hampshire.

On Saturday, June 4, 2011, Oosterhuis was released by the Winnipeg Football Club for failing his physical.

External links
Winnipeg Blue Bombers bio

1977 births
Living people
Calgary Stampeders players
Canadian football defensive linemen
Canadian football fullbacks
New Hampshire Wildcats football players
People from Centre Wellington
Players of Canadian football from Ontario
Winnipeg Blue Bombers players